Miloš Belmužević (15th century) held the noble title de Saswar given to him by King Matthias Corvinus along with properties near Timișoara. He, the brothers Stefan (Miloš's son-in-law) and Dmitar Jakšić, Vuk Grgurević, Đurađ Branković, his three sons Grgur, Stefan, and Lazar of the famed Branković dynasty, and other Serbian noblemen were instrumental in resettling and populating the vast military frontier that divided Christendom from Islam as it was viewed at the time.

Biography
Miloš Belmužević was a Serbian nobleman, the son of Vuk Belmužević of the Belmužević noble family. He distinguished himself in the war of despot Đurađ Branković against the Republic of Venice, who was also the last voivode (duke) of Serbia in the Serbian land of Zeta. At the time of the despot Lazar Branković, Miloš Belmužević was also the commander of Srebrenica (1457) until the fall of the city into the hands of King Thomas of Bosnia, in 1458. In 1464, he took refuge in the protected territories of Dubrovnik, in Ston, from where he left for the Kingdom of Hungary in 1469. He quickly became the commander of the cavalry of the Hungarian king Matthias Corvinus. For his war merits, he received estates in Hungary, in the Nitra County (now Slovakia), whose headquarters were in Šaštin. For his help during the fight against the German Emperor Frederick III of Habsburg and the King of Poland, he received estates in the Temes County and the title of egregious. Miloš Belmužević received the estates again in 1483 in Majs and Poznad in the Timișoara County. In addition to those estates, he also had estates in Serbia, which was under Ottoman rule at the time. His estates in the Smederevo Sandzak are listed in the defter from 1476. Among them is the village of Jagodina with an income of 8,533 akca. Also, Belmužević took part further south in the Glogovac war as the commander of a detachment of Serbs in the Hungarian outfit in 1488, and on that occasion, he was wounded.

Thirteen years later, in his last fights in the Christian military frontier against the Ottomans in 1501, Miloš Belmužević was deadly injured and lost his one and only son, Vuk. He wrote a testament, in the presence of monk Timotija of Chilandar, where he gave his properties to his daughter Milica, who was married to Stefan Jakšić. This document is the oldest known testament of Serbs in Hungary.

References

Sources 

 
 
 
 

People from Timiș County
15th-century Romanian people
15th-century Serbian nobility
1501 deaths
Serbian military leaders